Sonia Garel (born March 1, 1972) is a French immunologist who is a professor of neurobiology at the Collège de France. She was appointed to the Ordre national du Mérite in 2016 and won the 2020 Prize of the NRJ- Institut de France Foundation.

Early life and education 
Garel was born in Paris. She studied engineering at the AgroParisTech as an undergraduate. She moved to the Paris-Sorbonne University for graduate research, where she specialised in molecular and cellular neurobiology. Her doctoral research considered developmental biology. She moved to the University of California, San Francisco as a postdoctoral researcher with John Rubenstein. In 2003, she returned to France as an Inserm Research Officer.

Research and career 
In 2008, Garel joined the Institut of Biology of the Ecole Normale Superieure. She was made professor at the Collège de France in 2020. She was elected to the Scientific Council of the City of Paris in 2021.

Garel's research looks to understand the assembly of neural circuitry during embryogenesis. She focuses on the interactions between microglia, the macrophages of the central nervous system, and the molecular mechanisms that underpin the assembly of neurons. Her research identified that how microglia develop in germ free mice depends on the sex of the mice, which Garel thinks might explain why boys were four times as likely to be diagnosed with autism.

Awards and honours 
 2008 Young European Researchers Award
 2012 EMBO Young Researchers Award
 2012 European Research Council Consolidator Grant
 2014 Antoine Lacassagne Prize of the Collège de France
 2016 Chevalière de l’ordre national du Mérite
 2018 EMBO Member
 2019 Fondation Schlumberger pour l’Education et la Recherche (FSER) laureate
 2020 Grad Prize of the NRJ - Institut de France Foundation

References 

1972 births
Living people
French immunologists
Women immunologists
Scientists from Paris
Paris-Saclay University alumni
University of California, San Francisco staff
Academic staff of the Collège de France
21st-century French scientists
21st-century French women scientists